Ubaydul Haq is an Arabic phrase meaning Servant of the Truth. It may refer to

 M. Obaidul Huq (died 2012), Bangladeshi engineer, freedom fighter and politician
 Obaidul Haque (1934–2008), Bangladeshi Islamic scholar and politician
 Obaidul Huq (1911–2007), Bangladeshi cinematographer
 Obaidul Huq Khandaker, Bangladeshi politician
 Ubaidul Haq (1928–2007), Bangladeshi Islamic scholar and former khatib of Baitul Mukarram National Mosque